"Don't Blame Me" is a popular song with music by Jimmy McHugh and lyrics by Dorothy Fields. The song was part of the 1932 show Clowns in Clover and was published in 1933. Popular versions that year were recorded by: Ethel Waters (US No. 6), Guy Lombardo, and Charles Agnew.

Later recordings
It was a No. 21 hit for Nat King Cole in 1948. 
The song received two significant "rock era" remakes: a ballad version by the Everly Brothers in 1961 which reached No. 20 on Billboard, and an up-tempo version by Frank Ifield which reached No. 8 on the UK Singles Chart on 15 February 1964, as well as in New Zealand. In the U.S., Ifield's version reached No. 128.

Other recordings
 Charles Agnew and his Hotel Stevens Orchestra (1933). The New Yorker magazine reviewed this recording as "richly played."
 Duke Jordan with Sam Jones and Al Foster (1975)
 Terence Blanchard with Cassandra Wilson – Let's Get Lost (2001)
 King Cole October 1938, July 1944, November 21, 1944, May 19, 1945, July 14, 1955
 Perry Como's earliest known recording of the song was broadcast Monday, May 3, 1943 from New York City as part of Columbia Presents Perry Como. He recorded the song as part of a Chesterfield Supper Club program in 1945 or 1946 that was rebroadcast by the AFRS as AFRS Supper Club #283. 
 Bing Crosby recorded the song in 1956 for use on his radio show. It was included in the box set The Bing Crosby CBS Radio Recordings (1954–56) issued by Mosaic in 2009. 
 Shep Fields with his New Music Orchestra – (RCA Victor, 1948)
 Coleman Hawkins with Teddy Wilson – 1944
 J. J. Johnson – 1949
 Johnnie Ray Johnnie Ray with The Buddy Cole Quartet, (Columbia Records CL-6199, 1952)  Following "Whiskey & Gin" & the smash "Cry," his first two hit singles released on Okeh in 1951,  "Don't Blame Me" was the first of eight sides of Johnnie Ray's debut album for Columbia in 1952 
 Steve Grossman with Michel Petrucciani – Steve Grossman Quartet with Michel Petrucciani
 Thelonious Monk – Criss Cross (1963)
Yusuf Lateef – Eastern Sounds (1962)
 Ethel Waters with the Dorsey Brothers Orchestra – 1933
 Teddy Wilson – 1937

Popular culture
The song was performed in a restaurant scene with Albert Finney and Diane Keaton in the 1982 film Shoot the Moon.

See also
List of 1930s jazz standards

References

External links
"Don't Blame Me" at Jazz Standards

Songs with music by Jimmy McHugh
Songs with lyrics by Dorothy Fields
1933 songs
1933 singles
1948 singles
1961 singles
1964 singles
1930s jazz standards
The Everly Brothers songs
Frank Ifield songs
Warner Records singles
Johnnie Ray songs
Jazz compositions in C major
Guy Lombardo songs
Nat King Cole songs